Two ships of the United States Navy have borne the name Dutton in honor of Captain Benjamin Dutton, Jr.  

 , the former PCS-1396, a survey ship in commission from 1944 to 1949.
 , the former SS Tuskegee Victory, placed in service as a survey ship in 1958.

United States Navy ship names